Indravarman III, also titled Srindravarman was a ruler of the Khmer Empire from 1295 to 1308. He rose to power after the abdication of his father in law Jayavarman VIII, whose eldest daughter, Srindrabhupesvarachuda, he had married. Indravarman III was a follower of Theravada Buddhism and upon his ascension to power he made it the state religion.

He was entrusted with the command of the army. Had his lover, princess Srindrabhupesvera Cuda, stole the Sacred Sword from the king and gave it to him.The crown prince prepared to resist but Indravarman seized him, had his toes cut off, and then put him in prison. Having put down any resistance to his grab for power, he was then crowned king by the royal hotar Vidyesavid. He then married the princess to legitimize his reign. Later on he married Suryalakshmi, the niece of Vidyesavid.

According to legends he was known for his special weapon, a bat made of ironwood.

References

14th-century Cambodian monarchs
Cambodian Buddhist monarchs
Khmer Empire
Cambodian Theravada Buddhists
1308 deaths
Year of birth unknown
13th-century Cambodian monarchs